ASHP may refer to:

American Society of Health-System Pharmacists, a professional organization representing the interests of pharmacists.
Air source heat pumps, a heating and cooling system.